Jan Torbjörn Rippe (born 26 April 1955) is a Swedish actor, singer, and comedian. He is known as a member of the comedic groups Galenskaparna and After Shave. He also had a role in the comedy series Macken.

Early life
Rippe was born in Lyrestad. During his youth, he was an active competitive swimmer and participated in several district and Swedish national championships. He studied at Chalmers and was a member of the Elektroteknologsektionens tidningsförening.

Career
In Gothenburg he met and befriended the other members of the group After Shave and participated in Galenskaparna och After Shave's revue Skruven är lös. He became widely known to Swedish audiences from his role as Roger in the 1986 television comedy series Macken which was broadcast on SVT. He also voiced the part of Pumbaa in the Swedish language version of the Disney film The Lion King. He did not reprise his role in the sequels and spin-offs in the 90's, due to Peter Rangmar's death of melanoma in May 1997. Rangmar was Timon's Swedish voice and he and Rippe had a close friendship. Rippe reprised the role in The Lion King 1½. Timon were now voiced by Per Fritzell.

Rippe often plays characters that are confused, slow people that make everything the wrong way and have low self-confidence as a result of this. Amongst Rippe's roles are Kennet Aalborg in the TV-series En himla många program, the producer Viggo Florin in the film Monopol, and Ernst Ivarsson in Stinsen Brinner. One of the characters that he often plays is that of Goja, an individual that tells rambling stories without an ending or point. Jan Rippe participated in SVTs television broadcasts of the 2006 Winter Olympics in Turin as a tittarombudsman.

In October 2016, a theater version of Macken was made at the Lorensbergsteatern, with Rippe playing his original role.

Personal life
In 2009, Rippe suffered a heart attack.

Filmography

1986 – Macken (TV-series)
1986 – The Castle Tour
1987 – Leif
1989 – En himla många program
1989 – Hajen som visste för mycket
1990 – Macken – Roy's & Roger's Bilservice
1991 – Stinsen brinner... filmen alltså
1991 – Luigis Paradis
1993 – Tornado
1994 – The Lion King (Voice of Pumbaa)
1996 – Monopol
1998 – Åke från Åstol
2000 – Gladpack
2004 – The Lion King 3 – Hakuna Matata (Voice of  Pumbaa)
2005 – En decemberdröm
2006 – Den enskilde medborgaren

References

External links

Living people
1955 births
Swedish male comedians
People from Mariestad Municipality
Chalmers University of Technology alumni
Galenskaparna och After Shave members
20th-century Swedish comedians
21st-century Swedish comedians